"Everything I Miss at Home" is a 1988 single by Cherrelle from her third studio album Affair.  The single was one of the most successful of her career, peaking at number one on The Black Singles chart for one week.  Unlike previous Cherrelle releases, "Everything I Miss at Home" did not chart on the Hot 100.

References

Cherrelle songs
1988 songs
1988 singles
Songs written by Jimmy Jam and Terry Lewis
Contemporary R&B ballads
Soul ballads
1980s ballads